The 2003 NCAA Division I-A football season ended with an abundance of controversy, resulting in the claim of a split national championship. This was the first claimed split title since the inception of the BCS, something the BCS intended to eliminate.

At season's end, three BCS Automatic Qualifying (AQ) conference teams finished the regular season with one loss, with only two spots available in the BCS National Championship Game. Three BCS Non-Automatic Qualifying (Non-AQ) conference teams also finished with one loss, TCU, Boise State and Miami (OH), stirring the debate of the BCS being unfair to BCS Non-AQ conference teams.

LSU defeated Oklahoma in the 2004 Sugar Bowl, securing the BCS National Championship, as the ESPN/USA Today Coaches' Poll was contractually obligated to vote the winner of the BCS National Championship Game No. 1, although three coaches violated this agreement by keeping USC atop their ballots. Meanwhile, when AP No. 1 USC beat (number 4) Michigan in the 2004 Rose Bowl, the AP voters kept USC in the top spot.

Army became the first team in NCAA Division I-A football modern history to finish the season 0–13.

The Home Depot Coach of the Year Award sponsored by ESPN chose USC coach Pete Carroll as their award recipient, while the Paul "Bear" Bryant Award, voted on by an association of sportswriters, chose LSU coach Nick Saban.

The Orange Bowl game was noteworthy in that Miami and Florida State previously had scheduled to play each other on Labor Day in 2004 in Miami's first game as a member of the Atlantic Coast Conference. Playing in the Orange Bowl ensured that their next meeting would be each of their very next games and their first of the 2004 season.

BCS selection process controversy

USC had lost in triple overtime at California on September 27, LSU lost at home to Florida on October 11, and Oklahoma, which had been No. 1 in every BCS rating, AP and Coaches' Poll of the season, lost to Kansas State in the Big 12 Championship Game, 35–7 on December 6. Although USC, then 11–1, finished ranked No. 1 in both the AP and Coaches' Polls, with LSU (12–1) ranked No. 2 and Oklahoma (12–1) No. 3, Oklahoma surpassed both USC and LSU on several BCS computer factors. Oklahoma's schedule strength was ranked 11th to LSU's 29th and USC's 37th. Oklahoma's schedule rank was 0.44 to LSU's 1.16 and USC's 1.48. As such, although the timing of Oklahoma's loss affected the human voters, the computers kept Oklahoma at No. 1 in the BCS poll. LSU was ranked No. 2 by the BCS based on its No. 2 ranking in the AP Poll, Coaches' Poll, six of seven computer rankings (with the remaining one ranking them No. 1), and strength-of-schedule calculations. USC's No. 3 BCS ranking resulted from its No. 1 AP ranking, No. 1 Coaches' Poll ranking, and No. 3 ranking in five of seven computer rankings (with the two remaining computer rankings at No. 1 and No. 4), and schedule strength, though separated by only 0.16 points.

Ted Waitt, CEO of Gateway Computers, offered the NCAA $31 million for a national championship game between USC and Louisiana State.

Rules changes
The NCAA Rules Committee adopted the following rules changes for the 2003 season:
 The "Halo Rule" (two-yard restricted area around the kick/punt returner) is abolished.  The penalty for kick-catch interference remains at 15 yards if the returner is contacted before he has a chance to catch the punt/kick.
 Backs not positioned within the "tackle box" are prohibited from blocking below the waist anywhere behind the scrimmage line, and up to a point 10 yards downfield.
 The game clock will start on all kickoffs once touched in the field of play, repealing a rule change adopted in the 1997 season where the clock started on the kick (except during the final 2:00 of each half).
 Giving the offended team the option to enforce all personal fouls committed during and after a touchdown play either on the PAT or on the ensuing kickoff.

Conference and program changes
No teams upgraded from Division I-AA, leaving the number of Division I-A schools fixed at 117.
Two Independent schools joined conferences in 2003.  South Florida joined Conference USA as its 11th member, while Utah State joined the Sun Belt Conference as its 8th member.

Regular season top 10 matchups
Rankings reflect the AP Poll. Rankings for Week 8 and beyond will list BCS Rankings first and AP Poll second. Teams that failed to be a top 10 team for one poll or the other will be noted.
Week 1
No. 8 USC defeated No. 6 Auburn, 23–0 (Jordan-Hare Stadium, Auburn, Alabama)
Week 6
No. 2 Miami defeated No. 5 Florida State, 22–14 (Doak Campbell Stadium, Tallahassee, Florida)
Week 7
No. 8 Ohio State defeated No. 9 Iowa, 19–10 (Ohio Stadium, Columbus, Ohio)
Week 9
No. 4/3 USC defeated No. 8/6 Washington State, 43–16 (Los Angeles Memorial Coliseum, Los Angeles, California)
No. 16/10 Virginia Tech defeated No. 2/2 Miami, 31–7 (Lane Stadium, Blacksburg, Virginia)
Week 12
No. 9/5 Michigan defeated No. 2/4 Ohio State, 35–21 (Michigan Stadium, Ann Arbor, Michigan)
Week 14
No. 3/3 LSU defeated No. 7/5 Georgia, 34–13 (2003 SEC Championship Game, Georgia Dome, Atlanta, Georgia)

Conference standings

Bowl Championship Series rankings

Bowl games

Rankings given are AP poll positions at time of game

BCS bowls
Sugar Bowl, BCS National Championship Game: No. 2 (BCS No. 2) LSU 21, No. 3 (BCS No. 1) Oklahoma 14
Rose Bowl:  No. 1 (Pac-10 Champ) Southern California 28, No. 4 (Big 10 Champ) Michigan 14
Orange Bowl: No. 10 (Big East Champ) Miami 16, No. 9 (ACC Champ) Florida State 14
Fiesta Bowl: No. 6 (At Large) Ohio State 35, No. 8 (Big 12 Champ) Kansas State 28

Other January bowls
Cotton Bowl Classic: No. 16 Mississippi 31, No. 21 Oklahoma State 28
Capital One Bowl: No. 11 Georgia 34, No. 12 Purdue 27 (OT)
Gator Bowl: No. 23 Maryland 41, No. 20 West Virginia 7
Outback Bowl: No. 13 Iowa 37, No. 17 Florida 17
Peach Bowl: Clemson 27, No. 6 Tennessee 14
Humanitarian Bowl: Georgia Tech 52, Tulsa 10

December Bowl games
Houston Bowl: Texas Tech 38, Navy 14
Liberty Bowl: No. 25 (MWC Champ) Utah 17, (C-USA Champ) Southern Mississippi 0
Continental Tire Bowl: Virginia 23, Pittsburgh 16
Independence Bowl: Arkansas 27, Missouri 14
Silicon Valley Football Classic: Fresno State 17, UCLA 9
Sun Bowl: No. 24 Minnesota 31, Oregon 30
Music City Bowl: Auburn 28, Wisconsin 14
Holiday Bowl: No. 15 Washington State 28, No. 5 Texas 20
San Francisco Bowl: Boston College 35, Colorado State 21
Alamo Bowl: No. 22 Nebraska 17, Michigan State 3
Insight Bowl: California 52, Virginia Tech 49
Tangerine Bowl: NC State 56, Kansas 26
Motor City Bowl: Bowling Green 28, Northwestern 24
Hawai'i Bowl: Hawai'i 54, Houston 48 (3 OT)
Fort Worth Bowl: No. 18 (WAC Champ) Boise State 34, No. 19 TCU 31
Las Vegas Bowl: Oregon State 55, New Mexico 14
GMAC Bowl: No. 14 (MAC Champ) Miami (Ohio) 49, Louisville 28
New Orleans Bowl: Memphis 27, (Sun Belt Champ) North Texas 17

Final AP Poll

Others receiving votes: 26. Oklahoma State 109, 27. Arkansas 73, 28. Virginia 36, 29. Northern Illinois 30, 30. Auburn 8, 30. Oregon State 8, 32. Pittsburgh 7, 32. N.C. State 7, 34. West Virginia 4, 35. Connecticut 2.

Final Coaches Poll
Three coaches voted for USC as the No. 1 team, even though the polled coaches are required to vote the BCS champion as No. 1. Because the votes were not public, it is not known which three coaches placed those votes. However, it is known that USC coach Pete Carroll could not have voted for his own team since he was not a voting coach that season.

 
Also receiving votes

Northern Illinois (10–2) 80; Arkansas (9–4) 74; Oklahoma State (9–4) 63; Auburn (8–5) 20; North Carolina State (8–5) 17; Oregon State (8–5) 15; West Virginia (8–5) 14; Southern Mississippi (9–4) 12; Fresno State (9–5) 6; Hawaii (9–5) 6; Pittsburgh (8–5) 5; Texas Tech (8–5) 4; Marshall (8–4) 3; Virginia (8–5) 3; Boston College (8–5) 2; California (8–6) 1; Connecticut (9–3) 1; Memphis (9–4) 1; Michigan State Spartans (8–5) 1; Missouri (8–5) 1; North Texas (9–4) 1.

Heisman Trophy voting
The Heisman Trophy is given to the most outstanding player of the year

Winner: Jason White (Jr.), QB, Oklahoma (1,481 points)
2. Larry Fitzgerald (So.), WR, Pittsburgh (1,353 points)
3. Eli Manning (Sr.), QB, Mississippi (710 points)
4. Chris Perry (Sr.), RB, Michigan (341 points)

Other major awards
Maxwell Award (College Player of the Year): Eli Manning, Mississippi
Walter Camp Award (top back): Larry Fitzgerald, Pittsburgh
AP Player Of the Year: Jason White, Oklahoma
Davey O'Brien Award (quarterback): Jason White, Oklahoma
Johnny Unitas Award (Sr. quarterback): Eli Manning, Mississippi
Doak Walker Award (running back): Chris Perry, Michigan
Fred Biletnikoff Award (wide receiver): Larry Fitzgerald, Pittsburgh
John Mackey Award (tight end): Kellen Winslow, Miami, Florida
Lombardi Award (top lineman/linebacker): Tommie Harris, Oklahoma
Dave Rimington Trophy (center): Jake Grove, Virginia Tech
Outland Trophy (interior lineman): Robert Gallery, Iowa
Chuck Bednarik Award (defensive player): Teddy Lehman, Oklahoma
Dick Butkus Award (linebacker): Teddy Lehman, Oklahoma
Jim Thorpe Award (defensive back): Derrick Strait, Oklahoma
Lou Groza Award (placekicker): Jonathan Nichols, Mississippi
Ray Guy (punter): B.J. Sander, Ohio State
Paul "Bear" Bryant Award (Coach of the Year): Nick Saban, LSU
The Home Depot Coach of the Year Award: Pete Carroll, USC

References